Hayden is a given name in the English language. The name is variant of the given name Haydn, which is derived from the surname Haydn in honour of composer Joseph Haydn (1732–1809). The surname Haydn  originated as a respelling of the nickname Heiden, meaning "". The name is derived from the Middle High German heiden, and from the Old High German heidano.

The form Haydn was generally considered a masculine given name up until the mid 20th century. The popularity of Hayden has been influenced by the popularity of similar-sounding names such as Aidan, Braden, Caden, and Jaden.

In the United States, the name became progressively less used for males, dropping out of the top 1,000 names before 1950.  In the 1980s, the name reappeared, but was used for both males and females, with increasing popularity. Its popularity in the United States peaked at 2007 at 72nd most popular male name and in 2008 as the 127th most popular female name. It is now used in roughly equal numbers for American boys and girls. As a male name, Hayden also made a comeback in Australia in the 1980s and continues to reign in the top 100. In 2014, it came in at No. 66, up from No. 68 in 2013, but down from No. 52 in 2012 and No. 43 in 2011.

People 
 Hayden Byerly (born 2000), American actor, Jude Jacob on The Fosters
 Hayden Carruth (1921–2008), American poet and literary critic
 Hayden Chisholm (born 1975), New Zealand saxophonist, composer, and multi-instrumentalist
 Hayden Christensen (born 1981), Canadian actor, Star Wars
 Hayden Dalton (born 1996), American basketball player for Hapoel Holon of the Israeli Basketball Premier League
 Hayden Desser, Canadian musician
 Hayden Epstein (born 1980), American football player
 Hayden Foxe (born 1977), Australian soccer player
 Hayden Fry (1929–2019), American football coach
 Hayden Griffin (1943-2013), British stage designer
 Hayden Hurst (born 1993), American football player
 Hayden Kho (born 1980), Filipino cosmetic doctor 
 Haydn Linsley (born 1993), English/New Zealand singer/songwriter
 Hayden Moore (born 1995), American football player
 Hayden Moss (born 1986), TV personality
 Hayden Mullins (born 1979), English football player
 Hayden Paddon (born 1987), New Zealand rally driver
 Hayden Panettiere (born 1989), American actress
 Hayden Roulston (born 1981) New Zealand cyclist
 Hayden Turner (born 1966), Australian zookeeper and television presenter
 Hayden White (born 1928), historian

Fictional characters
 Hayden Romero, a character in MTV's cult television series Teen Wolf.
 Hayden Fox, a character in ABC's sitcom television series Coach played by Craig T. Nelson.

See also 
 Hayden (surname)
 Haden (name), given name and surname
 Haydn (name), given name and surname

References 

English-language masculine given names
English-language feminine given names
English-language unisex given names
Feminine given names
Masculine given names
Unisex given names
English unisex given names
English masculine given names
English feminine given names